†Partula filosa was a species of air-breathing tropical land snail, a terrestrial pulmonate gastropod mollusk in the family Partulidae. This species was endemic to Tahiti, French Polynesia. It is now extinct.

References

External links

Fauna of French Polynesia
Partula (gastropod)
Taxonomy articles created by Polbot
Taxobox binomials not recognized by IUCN
Gastropods described in 1851